Alfred Stephen Gardella (January 11, 1918 – September 10, 2006) was a professional baseball player.  He was a first baseman for one season (1945) with the New York Giants.  For his career, he compiled a .077 batting average in 26 at-bats, with one run batted in.

He was born in New York City and died in Coral Springs, Florida at the age of 88.

External links

1918 births
2006 deaths
New York Giants (NL) players
Major League Baseball first basemen
Baseball players from New York (state)
Minor league baseball managers
Hot Springs Bathers players
Roanoke Red Sox players
Utica Braves players
Birmingham Barons players
Jersey City Giants players
Trois-Rivières Royals players
Wilmington Blue Rocks (1940–1952) players
Sportspeople from Coral Springs, Florida
Peekskill Highlanders players